It's Awfully Bad for Your Eyes, Darling was a BBC television situation comedy which ran for a single series of six episodes in November–December 1971, after a pilot in April 1971.

It was written by Jilly Cooper and Christopher Bond, and was about four posh young women sharing a flat in London. They were played by Jane Carr, Joanna Lumley, Elizabeth Knight and Jennifer Croxton; Jeremy Lloyd played a boyfriend. The series producer was Leon Thau.

Only the first episode of the series ("A New Lease") exists in the archives; the pilot and the rest of the series are missing.

References

1971 British television series debuts
1971 British television series endings
1970s British sitcoms
BBC television sitcoms
Comedy Playhouse
English-language television shows